Fitzhead Court and The Manor in Fitzhead, Somerset, England was built in the late 16th century and has now been split into two buildings. It is a Grade II* listed building.

History

Fitzhead Court and The Manor date from the late 16th century. The building was constructed by Major Robert Cannon (died 1685) a royalist veteran of the Civil War, and passed through his successors to the Somerville Barons. When the Somerville line died out it passed to Richard Beadon who was the Bishop of Bath and Wells.

The estate was sold to Baron Ashburton in 1840.

Architecture

The plan of the two-storey building of 1:4:1 bays is "U" shaped following the addition of service wings to the original court.

The interior includes Jacobean style plaster ceilings.

The red sandstone boundary walls and gate-piers are from the early 19th century.

References

Grade II* listed buildings in Taunton Deane
Grade II* listed houses in Somerset